The Mixed free routine competition of the 2020 European Aquatics Championships was held on 14 May 2021.

Results 
The final was held at 10:10.

References 

Mixed free routine